António Ribeiro O.F. (Évora, 1520 – Lisbon, 1591), known as O Chiado or O Poeta Chiado was a Portuguese poet.

O Chiado was a satirical poet of the sixteenth century, contemporary of Luís Vaz de Camões.
He was known as Chiado for having lived many years in Chiado, Lisbon, in the street so called already in the sixteenth century (today Rua Garrett).

Portuguese male poets
16th-century births
People from Lisbon
1591 deaths
People from Évora
16th-century Portuguese poets
16th-century male writers